The 2017 Women's National League, known for sponsorship reasons as the Continental Tyres Women's National League, was the seventh season of the Women's National League, the highest women's association football league in the Republic of Ireland. It was the second league season to run over an entire calendar year.

Wexford Youths won the season and their third National League title. Amber Barrett from Peamount United won her second top scorer award with 16 goals.

Teams

Format
Teams play each other three times, either twice at home and once away, or once at home and twice away. Each team plays 18 games, 9 home and 9 away.

Standings

Awards

Monthly awards

Annual awards

References

External links
wnl.fai.ie
Season at soccerway.com

Women's National League (Ireland) seasons
Ireland
Ireland
Women
1
1